Phantoms is the third studio album by English new wave band the Fixx, released in August 1984 by MCA Records.

It contains the American hit "Are We Ourselves?", which reached No. 15 on the Billboard Hot 100 in the fall of 1984. The song hit No. 1 on Billboards Album Rock Tracks chart, staying at the summit for several weeks. It was also assisted by a popular MTV music video. The album's cover art was provided by George Underwood, who had also provided artwork for the band's previous album, Reach the Beach (1983), and went on to illustrate future Fixx releases including Calm Animals (1989) and Beautiful Friction (2012).

Track listing

Personnel
Credits are adapted from the Phantoms liner notes.The Fixx Cy Curnin – vocals
 Adam Woods – drums; percussion
 Rupert Greenall – keyboards
 James West-Oram – guitar
 Dan K. Brown – bassProduction and artwork Rupert Hine — producer
 Stephen W Tayler, assisted by Andrew Scarth — recorded by, mixing
 George Underwood — cover art

 Charts Singles'

References

External links
 

The Fixx albums
1984 albums
MCA Records albums
Albums produced by Rupert Hine